Brambletye School is a coeducational day and boarding preparatory school in East Grinstead, West Sussex. It was founded as a small boys' boarding school in Kent between the world wars. The school moved to West Sussex and has since become coeducational.

History
Brambletye was founded at Sidcup Place, Kent in 1919. It moved to its present location in the Sussex countryside on the southern outskirts of East Grinstead in 1933. The main school building, which is in its own wooded estate of 140 acres, overlooks the Ashdown Forest and Weir Wood Reservoir. Brambletye was built in 1896 by Donald Larnach, former director of the Bank of New South Wales, as his country retreat. The school became a charitable trust in 1969 with a board of governors. In September 1986, the first girl was admitted and the school is now completely coeducational.

Recent building developments have included a seven-classroom block, a purpose-built arts centre including a 270-seat theatre, a sports hall, a pre-prep building and the redevelopment of the science laboratories. The Blencowe Centre won the Downland Prize for Architecture, Education, (joint winner) in 2010.

The Brambletye School Trust, a registered charity, created legal precedent in the UK with a value-added tax ruling.

Boarding
Brambletye pupils have the choice of being a day pupil, a day boarder (flexy boarding) or being a full boarder.

Notable alumni
 Nigel Broackes, founder of Trafalgar House
 Benedict Cumberbatch, actor
 Jeremy Moore, commander of the British land forces during the Falklands War in 1982.
 Nigel Morritt Wace, leading authority on the plant life of the four Tristan da Cunha Islands
 Sgt David Kennedy Raikes, WW2 pilot and war poet
 Sir Christopher Nugee, British Court of Appeal Judge
 Lt General Richard Nugee, Climate Change Lead for the Ministry of Defence

References

External links
School Website
Profile on the ISC website
Profile on the Good Schools Guide
Profile on Tatler Schools Guide 2015
Ofsted Boarding Inspection Reports

Educational institutions established in 1919
Boarding schools in West Sussex
Preparatory schools in West Sussex
1919 establishments in England
 
East Grinstead